The People's Liberation Army Navy (PLAN), also known as the People's Navy, Chinese Navy, or PLA Navy, is the maritime service branch of the People's Liberation Army.

The PLAN traces its lineage to naval units fighting during the Chinese Civil War and was established on 23 April 1949. Throughout the 1950s and early 1960s, the Soviet Union provided assistance to the PLAN in the form of naval advisers and export of equipment and technology.

Until the late 1980s, the PLAN was largely a riverine and littoral force (brown-water navy). In the 1990s, following the fall of the Soviet Union and a shift towards a more forward-oriented foreign and security policy, the leaders of the Chinese military were freed from worrying overland border disputes. Traditionally subordinated to the PLA Ground Force, PLAN leaders were now able to advocate for a renewed attention towards the seas.

Chinese military officials have outlined plans to operate in the first and second island chains, and are working towards blue water capability. Chinese strategists term the development of the PLAN from a green-water navy into "a regional blue-water defensive and offensive navy." As the PLAN expands into a blue-water navy, regular exercises and naval patrols in the South China Sea have been increased, particularly near the Senkaku Islands in the East China Sea and the island of Taiwan, which it claims. The People's Republic of China (PRC) along with the Republic of China (ROC), Vietnam, Brunei, Malaysia, and the Philippines claims a significant amount of maritime boundary located within the South China Sea.

The People's Liberation Army Navy is composed of five branches; the Submarine Force, the Surface Force, the Coastal Defense Force, the Marine Corps and the Naval Air Force. With a personnel strength of 240,000 personnel, including 15,000 marines and 26,000 naval air force personnel, it is the second largest navy in the world in terms of tonnage which stands at 1,820,222 tonnes as of 2019, only behind the United States Navy, and has the largest number of major surface combatants of any navy globally with an overall battle force of approximately 350 surface ships and submarines—in comparison, the United States Navy's battle force is approximately 293 ships.

History 

The PLAN traces its lineage to units of the Republic of China Navy (ROCN) who defected to the People's Liberation Army towards the end of the Chinese Civil War.  In 1949, Mao Zedong asserted that "to oppose imperialist aggression, we must build a powerful navy".  During the Landing Operation on Hainan Island, the communists used wooden junks fitted with mountain guns as both transport and warships against the ROCN. The navy was established on 23 April 1949 by consolidating regional naval forces under Joint Staff Department command in Jiangyan (now in Taizhou, Jiangsu).

The Naval Academy was set up at Dalian on 22 November 1949, mostly with Soviet instructors. It then consisted of a motley collection of ships and boats acquired from the Kuomintang forces. The Naval Air Force was added two years later. By 1954 an estimated 2,500 Soviet naval advisers were in China—possibly one adviser to every thirty Chinese naval personnel—and the Soviet Union began providing modern ships.

With Soviet assistance, the navy reorganized in 1954 and 1955 into the North Sea Fleet, East Sea Fleet, and South Sea Fleet, and a corps of admirals and other naval officers was established from the ranks of the ground forces. In shipbuilding the Soviets first assisted the Chinese, then the Chinese copied Soviet designs without assistance, and finally the Chinese produced vessels of their own design. Eventually Soviet assistance progressed to the point that a joint Sino-Soviet Pacific Ocean fleet was under discussion.

1950s and 1960s
Through the upheavals of the late 1950s and 1960s the Navy remained relatively undisturbed. Under the leadership of Minister of National Defense Lin Biao, large investments were made in naval construction during the frugal years immediately after the Great Leap Forward. During the Cultural Revolution, a number of top naval commissars and commanders were purged.

Naval forces were used to suppress a revolt in Wuhan in July 1967, but the service largely avoided the turmoil affecting the country. Although it paid lip service to Mao and assigned political commissars aboard ships, the Navy continued to train, build, and maintain the fleets as well the coastal defense and aviation arms, as well as in the performance of its mission.

1970s and 1980s
In the 1970s, when approximately 20 percent of the defense budget was allocated to naval forces, the Navy grew dramatically. The conventional submarine force increased from 35 to 100 boats, the number of missile-carrying ships grew from 20 to 200, and the production of larger surface ships, including support ships for oceangoing operations, increased. The Navy also began development of nuclear attack submarines (SSN) and nuclear-powered ballistic missile submarines (SSBN).

In the 1980s, under the leadership of Chief Naval Commander Liu Huaqing, the navy developed into a regional naval power, though naval construction continued at a level somewhat below the 1970s rate. Liu Huaqing was an Army Officer who spent most of his career in administrative positions involving science and technology. It was not until 1988 that the People's Liberation Army Navy was led by a Naval Officer. Liu was also very close to Deng Xiaoping as his modernization efforts were very much in keeping with Deng's national policies.

While under his leadership Naval construction yards produced fewer ships than the 1970s, greater emphasis was placed on technology and qualitative improvement. Modernization efforts also encompassed higher educational and technical standards for personnel; reformulation of the traditional coastal defense doctrine and force structure in favor of more green-water operations; and training in naval combined-arms operations involving submarine, surface, naval aviation, and coastal defense forces.

Examples of the expansion of China's capabilities were the 1980 recovery of an intercontinental ballistic missile (ICBM) in the Western Pacific by a twenty-ship fleet, extended naval operations in the South China Sea in 1984 and 1985, and the visit of two naval ships to three South Asian nations in 1985. In 1982 the navy conducted a successful test of an underwater-launched ballistic missile. The navy also had some success in developing a variety of surface-to-surface and air-to-surface missiles, improving basic capabilities.

In 1986 the Navy's order of battle included two Xia-class SSBNs armed with twelve CSS-N-3 missiles and three Han-class SSNs armed with six SY-2 cruise missiles. In the late 1980s, major deficiencies reportedly remained in anti-submarine warfare, mine warfare, naval electronics (including electronic countermeasures equipment), and naval aviation capabilities.

The PLA Navy was ranked in 1987 as the third largest navy in the world, although naval personnel had comprised only 12 percent of PLA strength. In 1987 the Navy consisted (as it does now) of the naval headquarters in Beijing; three fleet commands – the North Sea Fleet, based at Qingdao, Shandong; the East Sea Fleet, based at Ningbo; and the South Sea Fleet, based at Zhanjiang, Guangdong – and about 1,000 ships of which only approximately 350 are ocean going.  The rest are small patrol or support craft.

The 350,000-person Navy included Naval Air Force units of 34,000 men, the Coastal Defense Forces of 38,000, and the Marine Corps of 56,500. Navy Headquarters, which controlled the three fleet commands, was subordinate to the PLA General Staff Department. In 1987, China's 1,500 km coastline was protected by approximately 70 diesel-powered Romeo- and Whiskey-class submarines, which could remain at sea only a limited time.

Inside this protective ring and within range of shore-based aircraft were destroyers and frigates mounting Styx anti-ship missiles, depth-charge projectors, and guns up to 130 mm. Any invader penetrating the destroyer and frigate protection would have been swarmed by almost 900 fast-attack craft. Stormy weather limited the range of these small boats, however, and curtailed air support. Behind the inner ring were Coastal Defense Force personnel operating naval shore batteries of Styx missiles and guns, backed by ground force units deployed in depth.

1990s and 2000s
As the 21st century approached, the PLAN began to transition to an off-shore defensive strategy that entailed more out-of-area operations away from its traditional territorial waters.  Between 1989 and 1993, the training ship Zhenghe paid ports visits to Hawaii, Thailand, Bangladesh, Pakistan, and India.  PLAN vessels visited Vladivostok in 1993, 1994, 1995, and 1996.  PLAN task groups also paid visits to Indonesia in 1995; North Korea in 1997; New Zealand, Australia, and the Philippines in 1998; Malaysia, Tanzania, South Africa, the United States, and Canada in 2000; and India, Pakistan, France, Italy, Germany, Britain, Hong Kong, Australia, and New Zealand in 2001.

In March 1997, the Luhu-class guided missile destroyer Harbin, the Luda-class guided missile destroyer Zhuhai, and the replenishment oiler Nancang began the PLA Navy's first circumnavigation of the Pacific Ocean, a 98-day voyage with port visits to Mexico, Peru, Chile, and the United States, including Pearl Harbor and San Diego.  The flotilla was under the command of Vice Admiral Wang Yongguo, the commander-in-chief of the South Sea Fleet.

The Luhu-class guided missile destroyer Qingdao and the replenishment oiler Taicang completed the PLA Navy's first circumnavigation of the world (pictured), a 123-day voyage covering  between 15 May – 23 September 2002.  Port visits included Changi, Singapore; Alexandria, Egypt; Aksis, Turkey; Sevastopol, Ukraine; Piraeus, Greece; Lisbon, Portugal; Fortaleza, Brazil; Guayaquil, Ecuador; Callao, Peru; and Papeete in French Polynesia.  The PLA naval vessels participated in naval exercises with the French frigates Nivôse and Prairial, as well as exercises with the Peruvian Navy.  The flotilla was under the command of Vice Admiral Ding Yiping, the commander-in-chief of the North Sea Fleet, and Captain Li Yujie was the commanding officer of the Qingdao.

Overall, between 1985 and 2006, PLAN naval vessels visited 18 Asian-Pacific nations, 4 South American nations, 8 European nations, 3 African nations, and 3 North American nations.  In 2003, the PLAN conducted its first joint naval exercises during separate visits to Pakistan and India. Bi-lateral naval exercises were also carried out with exercises with the French, British, Australian, Canadian, Philippine, and United States navies.

On 26 December 2008, the PLAN dispatched a task group consisting of the guided missile destroyer Haikou (flagship), the guided missile destroyer Wuhan, and the supply ship Weishanhu to the Gulf of Aden to participate in anti-piracy operations off the coast of Somalia.  A team of 16 Chinese Special Forces members from its Marine Corps armed with attack helicopters were on board. Since then, China has maintained a three-ship flotilla of two warships and one supply ship in the Gulf of Aden by assigning ships to the Gulf of Aden on a three monthly basis. Other recent PLAN incidents include the 2001 Hainan Island incident, a major submarine accident in 2003, and naval incidents involving the U.S. MSC-operated ocean surveillance ships  and  during 2009. At the occasion of the 60th anniversary of the PLAN, 52 to 56 vessels were shown in manoeuvres off Qingdao in April 2009 including previously unseen nuclear submarines.

The demonstration was seen as a sign of the growing status of China, while the CMC Chairman, Hu Jintao, indicated that China is neither seeking regional hegemony nor entering an arms race. 
Predictions by Western analysts that the PLAN would outnumber the USN submarine force as early as 2011 have failed to come true because the PRC curtailed both imports and domestic production of submarines.

2010s and 2020s 

Beginning in 2009, China ordered 4 Zubr-class LCAC from Ukraine and bought 4 more from the Hellenic Navy (Greece). These hovercraft/LCACs are built to send troops and armored vehicles (tanks, etc.) onto beaches in a fast manner, acting as a landing craft, and were viewed to be a direct threat to Taiwan's pro-independence movement as well as the conflict over Senkaku Islands. China is continually shifting the power balance in Asia by building up the Navy's Submarines, Amphibious warfare, and surface warfare capabilities.

Between 5–12 July 2013, a seven-ship task force from the North Sea Fleet joined warships from the Russian Pacific Fleet to participate in Joint Sea 2013, bilateral naval maneuvers held in the Peter the Great Bay of the Sea of Japan. To date, Joint Sea 2013 was the largest naval drill yet undertaken by the People's Liberation Army Navy with a foreign navy.

On 2 April 2015, during the violent aftermath of a coup d'état in Yemen and amid an international bombing campaign, the PLAN helped ten countries get their citizens out of Yemen safely, evacuating them aboard a missile frigate from the besieged port city of Aden. The operation was described by Reuters as "the first time that China's military has helped other countries evacuate their people during an international crisis".

China's participation in international maritime exercises is also increasing. In RIMPAC 2014, China was invited to send ships from their People's Liberation Army Navy; marking not only the first time China participated in a RIMPAC exercise but also the first time China participated in a large-scale United States-led naval drill. On 9 June 2014, China confirmed it would be sending four ships to the exercise, a destroyer, frigate, supply ship, & hospital ship. In April 2016, the People's Republic of China was also invited to RIMPAC 2016 despite the tension in South China Sea.

PRC military expert Yin Zhuo said that due to present weaknesses in the PLAN's ability to replenish their ships at sea, their future aircraft carriers will be forced to operate in pairs.
In a TV interview, Zhang Zhaozhong suggest otherwise, saying China is "unlikely to put all her eggs in one basket" and that the navy will likely rotate between carriers rather than deploy them all at once.

The PLAN continued its expansion into the 2020s, increasing its operational capacity, commissioning new ships, and constructing naval facilities. Observers note that the PLAN's ongoing modernization is intended to build up the Chinese surface fleet and fix existing issues that limit the capability of the PLAN. Observers have noted that the PLAN's expansion will allow it to project Chinese power in the South China Sea and allow for the navy to counter the USN's operations in Asia. Chinese naval capability increased substantially in the 2010s and 2020s. According to the US-based think tank RAND Corporation, PLAN enjoyed major advantages in terms of naval technologies, missiles, and tonnage against regional rivals such as Taiwan, Japan, Vietnam, the Philippines, and India. And analysts believe China will further improve its power projection capability to challenge the United States Navy in the western Pacific.

Organization

The PLAN is organized into several departments for purposes of command, control and coordination. Main operating forces are organized into fleets, each with its own headquarters, a commander (a Rear Admiral or Vice Admiral) and a Political Commisar. All PLAN headquarters are subordinate to the PLA Joint Staff Department and the Chairman of the Central Military Commission.

Fleets
The People's Liberation Army Navy is divided into three fleets:
 The North Sea Fleet, based in the Yellow Sea and headquartered in Qingdao, Shandong Province.
 The East Sea Fleet, based in the East China Sea and headquartered in Ningbo, Zhejiang Province.
 The South Sea Fleet, based in the South China Sea and headquartered in Zhanjiang, Guangdong Province.

Each fleet consists of surface forces (destroyers, frigates, amphibious vessels etc.), submarine forces, coastal defence units, and aircraft.

Branches

PLAN Surface Force

The People's Liberation Army Surface Force consists of all surface warships in service with the PLAN.  They are organised into flotillas spread across the three main fleets.

PLAN Submarine Force

The People's Liberation Army Navy Submarine Force consists of all nuclear and diesel-electric submarines in service with the PLAN.  They are organised into flotillas spread across the three main fleets.

The PRC is the last of the permanent members of the United Nations Security Council which has not conducted an operational ballistic missile submarine patrol, because of institutional problems. It operates a fleet of 68 submarines.

PLAN Coastal Defence Force

The PLAN Coastal Defence Force is a land-based branch of the PLAN in charge of coastal defence, with a strength of around 25,000 personnel. Also known as the coastal defense troops, they serve to defend China's coastal and littoral areas from invasion via amphibious landings or air attacks.

Between the 1950s and 1960s, the Coastal Defense Force was primarily assigned to repel any Kuomintang attempts to infiltrate, invade and harass the Chinese coastline.  After the Sino-Soviet split and the abandonment of KMT's plans to recapture the Mainland, the Coastal Defense Force was focused on defending China's coast from a possible Soviet sea-borne invasion throughout the 1960s to 1980s.

With the fall of the Soviet Union, the threat of an amphibious invasion of China has diminished and therefore the branch is often considered to no longer be a vital component of the PLAN, especially as the surface warships of the PLAN continue to improve in terms of anti-ship and air-defence capabilities and the PLAN's power projection begins to extend beyond the first island chain.

Today the primary weapons of the coastal defense troops are the HY-2, YJ-82 and C-602 anti-ship missiles.

PLAN Marine Corps

The PLAN Marine Corps was originally established in the 1950s and then re-established in 1979 under PLAN organisation.  It consists of around 20,000 marines, and is based in the South China Sea with the South Sea Fleet. The Marine Corps are considered elite troops, and are rapid deployment forces trained primarily in amphibious warfare and sometimes as paratroopers to establish a beachhead or act as a spearhead during assault operations against enemy targets.

The marines are equipped with the standard Type 95 assault rifles as well as other small arms and personnel equipment, and a blue/littoral camouflage uniform as standard.  The marines are also equipped with amphibious armoured fighting vehicles (including amphibious light tanks such as the Type 63, assault vehicles such as the ZTD-05 and IFVs such as ZBD-05), helicopters, naval artillery, anti-aircraft weapon systems and short range surface-to-air missiles.

With the PLAN's accelerating efforts to expand its capabilities beyond territorial waters, it would be likely for the Marine Corps to play a greater role in terms of being an offshore expeditionary force similar to the USMC and Royal Marines.

PLA Naval Air Force

The People's Liberation Army Naval Air Force (PLANAF) is the naval aviation branch of the PLAN and has a strength of around 25,000 personnel and 690 aircraft.  It operates similar hardwares to the People's Liberation Army Air Force, including fighter aircraft, bombers, attack aircraft, tankers, reconnaissance/early warning aircraft, electronic warfare aircraft, maritime patrol aircraft, transport aircraft and helicopters of various roles.

The PLA Naval Air Force has traditionally operated from coastal air bases, and received older aircraft than the PLAAF with less ambitious steps towards mass modernization.  Advancements in new technologies, weaponry and aircraft acquisition were made after 2000.  With the introduction of China's first aircraft carrier, Liaoning, in 2012, the Naval Air Force is conducting carrier-based operations for the first time with the goal of building carrier battle group-focused blue water capabilities.

The PLANAF naval air bases include:
 North Sea Fleet: Dalian, Qingdao, Jinxi, Jiyuan, Laiyang, Jiaoxian, Xingtai, Laishan, Anyang, Changzhi, Liangxiang and Shan Hai Guan
 East Sea Fleet: Danyang, Daishan, Shanghai (Dachang), Ningbo, Luqiao, Feidong and Shitangqiao
 South Sea Fleet: Foluo, Haikou, Lingshui, Sanya, Guiping, Jialaishi and Lingling

Relationship with other maritime organizations of China

The PLAN is complemented by paramilitary maritime services such as the China Coast Guard.  The Chinese Coast Guard was previously not under an independent command, considered part of the People's Armed Police, under the local (provincial) border defense command, prior to its reorganization and consolidation as an unified service. It was formed from the integration of several formerly separate services such as China Marine Surveillance (CMS), General Administration of Customs, Armed Police, China Fishery Law Enforcement and local maritime militia.

The CMS performed mostly coastal and ocean search and rescue or patrols, and received quite a few large patrol ships that significantly enhanced their operations; while Customs, militia, Armed Police and Fishery Law Enforcement operated hundreds of small patrol craft. For maritime patrol services, these craft are usually quite well armed with machine guns and 37mm antiaircraft guns. In addition, these services operated their own small aviation fleets to assist their maritime patrol capabilities, with Customs and CMS operating a handful of Harbin Z-9 helicopters, and a maritime patrol aircraft based on the Harbin Y-12 STOL transport.

Every coastal province has 1 to 3 Coast Guard squadrons:
 3 Squadrons: Fujian, Guangdong
 2 Squadrons: Liaoning, Shandong, Zhejiang, Hainan, Guangxi
 1 Squadron: Heibei, Tianjin, Jiangsu, Shanghai

Ranks

The ranks in the People's Liberation Army Navy are similar to those of the People's Liberation Army Ground Force. The current system of officer ranks and insignia dates from 1988 and is a revision of the ranks and insignia used from 1955 to 1965. The rank of Hai Jun Yi Ji Shang Jiang (First Class Admiral) was never held and was abolished in 1994. With the official introduction of the Type 07 uniforms all officer insignia are on either shoulders or sleeves depending on the type of uniform used. The current system of enlisted ranks and insignia dates from 1998.

Commissioned officer ranks
The rank insignia of commissioned officers.

Other ranks
The rank insignia of non-commissioned officers and enlisted personnel.

Commanders
 Xiao Jinguang (January 1950 − January 1980)
 Ye Fei (January 1980 – August 1982)
 Liu Huaqing (August 1982 – January 1988)
 Zhang Lianzhong (January 1988 – November 1996)
 Shi Yunsheng (November 1996 – June 2003)
 Zhang Dingfa (June 2003 – August 2006)
 Wu Shengli (August 2006 – January 2017)
 Shen Jinlong (January 2017 – September 2021)
 Dong Jun (September 2021 – present)

Contemporary topics

Strategy, plans, priorities

The People's Liberation Army Navy has become more prominent in recent years owing to a change in Chinese strategic priorities.  The new strategic threats include possible conflict with the United States and/or a resurgent Japan in areas such as the Taiwan Strait or the South China Sea. As part of its overall program of naval modernization, the PLAN has a long-term plan of developing a blue water navy. Robert D. Kaplan has said that it was the collapse of the Soviet Union that allowed China to transfer resources from its army to its navy and other force projection assets.

China is constructing a major underground nuclear submarine base near Sanya, Hainan. In December 2007 the first Type 094 submarine was moved to Sanya.
The Daily Telegraph on 1 May 2008 reported that tunnels were being built into hillsides which could be capable of hiding up to 20 nuclear submarines from spy satellites.  According to the Western news media the base is reportedly to help China project seapower well into the Pacific Ocean area, including challenging United States naval power.

During a 2008 interview with the BBC, Major General Qian Lihua, a senior Chinese defense official, stated that the PLAN aspired to possess a small number of aircraft carriers to allow it to expand China's air defense perimeter. According to Qian the important issue was not whether China had an aircraft carrier, but what it did with it. On 13 January 2009, Adm. Robert F. Willard, head of the U.S. Pacific Command, called the PLAN's modernization "aggressive," and that it raised concerns in the region. On 15 July 2009, Senator Jim Webb of the Senate Foreign Relations Committee declared that only the "United States has both the stature and the national power to confront the obvious imbalance of power that China brings" to situations such as the claims to the Spratly and Paracel islands.

Ronald O'Rourke of the Congressional Research Service wrote in 2009 that the PLAN "continues to exhibit limitations or weaknesses in several areas, including capabilities for sustained operations by larger formations in distant waters, joint operations with other parts of China’s military, C4ISR systems, anti-air warfare (AAW), antisubmarine warfare (ASW), MCM, and a dependence on foreign suppliers for certain key ship components."

In 1998 China purchased the discarded Ukrainian ship Varyag and began retrofitting it for naval deployment. On 25 September 2012, the People's Liberation Army Navy took delivery of China's first aircraft carrier, the Liaoning. The 60,000-ton ship can accommodate 33 fixed wing aircraft. It is widely speculated that these aircraft will be the J15 fighter (the Chinese version of Russia's SU-33).

In September 2015, satellite images showed that China may have started constructing its first indigenous Type 002 aircraft carrier. At the time, the layout suggested to be displacement of 50,000 tons and a hull to have a length of about 240 m and a beam of about 35 m. The incomplete bow suggests a length of at least 270 m for the completed hull. In April 2017 the carrier was launched.

Japan has raised concerns about the PLAN's growing capability and the lack of transparency as its naval strength keeps on expanding. China has reportedly entered into service the world's first anti-ship ballistic missile called DF-21D. The potential threat from the DF-21D against U.S. aircraft carriers has reportedly caused major changes in U.S. strategy.

In June 2017 China launched a new type of large destroyer, the Type 055 destroyer. The new destroyer is, with its dimension of 180 meter and over 12,000 tons fully loaded, the second largest destroyer class in the world after the American Zumwalt-class destroyer.

Comparison to US Navy
The strength of PLAN is often compared to that of the US Navy. PLAN is the second largest navy in the world in terms of tonnage which stands at 1,820,222 tonne as of 2019, only behind the United States Navy. PLAN has the largest number of major surface combatants of any navy globally with an overall battle force of approximately 350 surface ships and submarines — in comparison, the United States Navy's battle force is approximately 293 ships.

Attempts have been made to compare PLAN's firepower with the USN. A 2019 review found the USN fleet was able to deploy more "battle force missiles" (BFMs), defined as those missiles that contribute to battle missions, than the PLAN: USN fleet could deploy 11,000 BFMs, compared to 5250 BFMs for PLAN and 3326 BFMs for the Russian Navy. A 2016 review concluded that PLAN's missiles had higher firepower than the USN's, measured in terms of "strike-mile", the ability to delivery a warhead using anti-ship missiles (ASM) across a given distance.
The review used the following formula for every ASM the navy had in its inventory:

 Total strike-miles=(Range of an ASM × Warhead weight of an ASM) × Number of such missiles carried by a warship × Number of such warships in the navy

It concluded the total firepower of the PLAN was 77 million strike-miles compared to 17 million strike-miles of the USN.

Territorial disputes

Spratly Islands dispute
The Spratly Islands dispute is a territorial dispute over the ownership of the Spratly Islands, a group of islands located in the South China Sea. States staking claims to various islands are Brunei, Malaysia, the Philippines, Taiwan, Vietnam, and People's Republic of China. All except Brunei occupy some of the islands in dispute.  The People's Republic of China conducted naval patrols in the Spratly Islands and established a permanent base.

On 14 March 1988, Chinese and Vietnamese naval forces clashed over Johnson South Reef in the Spratly Islands, which involved three PLAN frigates.

The shots were fired after the frigate instructed the fishing boats to leave, and one of those boats experienced trouble removing its anchor. In May 2011, the Chinese patrol boats attacked and cut the cable of Vietnamese oil exploration ships near Spratly islands. The incidence sparked several anti-China protests in Vietnam.
In June 2011, the Chinese navy conducted three days of exercises, including live fire drills, in the disputed waters. This was widely seen as a warning to Vietnam, which had also conducted live fire drills near the Spratly Islands. Chinese patrol boats fired repeated rounds at a target on an apparently uninhabited island, as twin fighter jets streaked in tandem overhead. 14 vessels participated in the maneuvers, staging antisubmarine and beach landing drills aimed at "defending atolls and protecting sea lanes."

In May 2013, the Chinese navy's three operational fleets deployed together for the first time since 2010.  This combined naval maneuvers in the South China Sea coincided with the ongoing Spratly Islands dispute between China and the Philippines as well as deployment of the U.S. Navy's Carrier Strike Group Eleven to the U.S. Seventh Fleet.

Senkaku Islands (Diaoyu) dispute
The Senkaku Islands dispute concerns a territorial dispute over a group of uninhabited islands known as the Diaoyu Islands in China, the Senkaku Islands in Japan, and Tiaoyutai Islands in Taiwan. Aside from a 1945 to 1972 period of administration by the United States, the archipelago has been controlled by Japan since 1895. The People's Republic of China disputed the proposed U.S. handover of authority to Japan in 1971 and has asserted its claims to the islands since that time. Taiwan also has claimed these islands.  The disputed territory is close to key shipping lanes and rich fishing grounds, and it may have major oil reserves in the area.

On some occasions, ships and planes from various Mainland Chinese and Taiwanese government and military agencies have entered the disputed area. In addition to the cases where they escorted fishing and activist vessels, there have been other incursions. In an eight-month period in 2012, over forty maritime incursions and 160 aerial incursions occurred. For example, in July 2012, three Chinese patrol vessels entered the disputed waters around the islands.

Military escalation continued in 2013. In February, Japanese Defense Minister Itsunori Onodera claimed that a Chinese frigate had locked weapons-targeting radar onto a Japanese destroyer and helicopter on two occasions in January. A Chinese Jiangwei II class frigate and a Japanese destroyer were three kilometers apart, and the crew of the latter vessel went to battle stations. The Chinese state media responded that their frigates had been engaged in routine training at the time.

In late February 2013, U.S. intelligence detected China moving road-mobile ballistic missiles closer to the coast near the disputed islands, including medium-range DF-16 anti-ship ballistic missiles. In May, a flotilla of Chinese warships from its North Sea Fleet deployed from Qingdao for training exercises western North Pacific Ocean. It is not known if this deployment is related to the ongoing islands dispute between China and Japan.

Other incidents

On 22 July 2011, following its Vietnam port-call, the Indian amphibious assault vessel  was reportedly contacted 45 nautical miles from the Vietnamese coast in the disputed South China Sea by a party identifying itself as the Chinese Navy and stating that the Indian warship was entering Chinese waters. According to a spokesperson for the Indian Navy, since there were no Chinese ships or aircraft were visible, the INS Airavat proceeded on her onward journey as scheduled. The Indian Navy further clarified that "[t]here was no confrontation involving the INS Airavat. India supports freedom of navigation in international waters, including in the South China Sea, and the right of passage in accordance with accepted principles of international law.  These principles should be respected by all."

On 11 July 2012, the Chinese frigate Dongguan ran aground on Hasa Hasa Shoal (pictured) located 60 nmi west of Rizal, which was within the Philippines' 200 nmi-EEZ. By 15 July, the frigate had been refloated and was returning to port with no injuries and only minor damage. During this incident, the 2012 ASEAN summit took place in Phnom Penh, Cambodia, amid the rising regional tensions.

2008 anti-piracy operations

On 18 December 2008, Chinese authorities deployed People's Liberation Army Navy vessels to escort Chinese shipping in the Gulf of Aden. This deployment came after a series of attacks and attempted hijackings on Chinese vessels by Somali pirates. Reports suggest two destroyers (Type 052C 171 Haikou and Type 052B 169 Wuhan) and a supply ship are the ones being used.

This move was welcomed by the international community as the warships complement a multinational fleet already operating along the coast of Africa. Since this operation PLAN has sought the leadership of the ‘Shared Awareness and Deconfliction (SHADE)' body, which would require an increase in the number of ships contributing to the anti-piracy fleet. This is the first time Chinese warships have deployed outside the Asia-Pacific region for a military operation since Zheng He's expeditions in the 15th century.

Since then more than 30 People's Liberation Army Navy ships has deployed to the Gulf of Aden in 18 Escort Task Groups.

2011 Libyan Civil War
In the lead-up to the 2011 Libyan Civil War, the Xuzhou (530) was deployed from anti-piracy operations in the Gulf of Aden to help evacuate Chinese nationals from Libya.

Yemen Conflict
During the Yemen conflict, in 2015, the Chinese Navy diverted frigates carrying out anti-piracy operations in Somalia to evacuate at least 600 Chinese and 225 foreign citizens working in Yemen. Among the non-Chinese evacuees were 176 Pakistani citizens, with smaller numbers from other countries, such as Ethiopia, Singapore, the UK, Italy, and Germany. Despite the evacuations, the Chinese embassy in Yemen continued to operate.

Equipment 

As of 2018, the Chinese navy operates over 496 combat ships and 232 various auxiliary vessels and counts 255,000 seamen in its ranks. The Chinese Navy also employ more than 710 naval aircraft, including fighters, bombers and electronic warfare aircraft. China has large amount of artillery, torpedoes, and missiles included in their combat assets.

Ships and submarines 

All ships and submarines currently in commission with the People's Liberation Army Navy were built in China, with the exception of the Sovremenny-class destroyers, Kilo-class submarines and the aircraft carrier Liaoning. Those vessels were either imported from, or originated from Russia. As of 2008, English-language official Chinese state media no longer uses the term "People's Liberation Army Navy", instead the term "Chinese Navy" along with the usage of the unofficial prefix "CNS" for "Chinese Navy Ship" is now employed.

China employs a wide range of Navy combatants including aircraft carriers, amphibious warfare ships, and destroyers. The Chinese Navy is undergoing modernization rapidly with nearly half of Chinese Navy combat ships built after 2010. China's state-owned shipyards have built 83 ships in just eight years with unprecedented speed. China has its own independent maritime missile defense and naval combat system similar to US Aegis.

Aircraft 

China operates carrier-based fighter aircraft to secure land, air and sea targets. The Chinese Navy also operates a wide range of helicopters for battlefield logistics, reconnaissance, patrol and medical evacuation.

Naval weaponry 

The unique QBS-06 is an underwater assault rifle with 5.8×42 DBS-06, and is used by Naval frogmen. It is based on the Soviet APS.

In early February 2018, pictures of what is claimed to be a Chinese railgun were published online. In pictures the gun is shown mounted on the bow of a Type 072III-class landing ship Haiyangshan. Media is suggesting that the system is or soon will be ready for testing. In March 2018, it was reported that China had confirmed that it had begun testing its electromagnetic rail gun at sea.

Future of the People's Liberation Army Navy

The PLAN's ambitions include operating out to the first and second island chains, as far as the South Pacific near Australia, and spanning to the Aleutian islands, and operations extending to the Straits of Malacca near the Indian Ocean. The future PLAN fleet will be composed of a balance of combatant assets aimed at maximising the PLAN's fighting effectiveness.

On the high end, there would be modern destroyers, such as stealth guided missile destroyers equipped with long-range air defense missiles and anti-submarine capabilities (Type 055).   There would be modern destroyers equipped with long-range air defense missiles (Type 052B, Type 052C, Type 052D and Type 051C, and destroyers armed with supersonic anti-ship missiles (Sovremenny class).

There would be advanced nuclear-powered attack and ballistic missile submarines (Type 093, Type 095, Type 094, Type 096), advanced conventional attack submarines (Kilo and Yuan classes), aircraft carriers (Type 001, Type 002 and Type 003), and helicopter carriers (Type 075) and large amphibious warfare vessels (Type 071) capable of mobilizing troops at long distances.

On the medium and low end, there would be more economical multi-role capable frigates and destroyers (Luhu, Jiangwei II and Jiangkai classes), corvettes (Jiangdao class), fast littoral missile attack craft (Houjian, Houxin and Houbei classes), various landing ships and light craft, and conventionally powered coastal patrol submarines (Song class). The obsolete combat ships (based on 1960s designs) will be phased out in the coming decades as more modern designs enter full production.

It may take a decade for the bulk of these older ships to be retired. Until then, they will serve principally on the low end, as multi-role patrol/escort platforms. Their use could be further enhanced in the future by being used as fast transports or fire support platforms. This system of phasing out would see a reversal in the decline in quantity of PLAN vessels by 2015, and cuts in inventory after the end of the Cold War could be made up for by 2020.

Between 2001 and 2006 there was a rapid building and acquisition program, a trend which continued. There were more than a dozen new classes of ships built in those five years, totaling some 60 brand new ships (including landing ships and auxiliaries). Simultaneously, dozens of other ships have been either phased out of service or refitted with new equipment.

Submarines play a significant role in the development of the PLAN's future fleet. This is made evident by the construction of a new type of nuclear ballistic missile submarine, the Type 094 and the Type 093 nuclear attack submarine. This will provide the PLAN with a more modern response for the need of a seaborne nuclear deterrent. The new submarines will also be capable of performing conventional strike and other special warfare requirements.

The European Union has provided much of the propulsion technology for the PLAN's modernization.

Ronald O'Rourke of the Congressional Research Service reported that the long-term goals of PLAN planning include:

 Assert or defend China's claims in maritime territorial disputes and China's interpretation of international laws relating to freedom of navigation in exclusive economic zones (an interpretation at odds with the U.S. interpretation);
 Protect China's sea lines of communications to the Persian Gulf, on which China relies for some of its energy imports.

During the military parade on the 60th anniversary of the People's Republic of China, the YJ-62 naval cruise missile made its first public appearance; the YJ-62 represents the next generation in naval weapons technology in the PLA.

Following the construction of its two smaller aircraft carriers, China began building the improved Type 003 carrier, which is expected to displace 83,000 tonnes and enable CATOBAR operations by 2022.

The PLAN may also operate from Gwadar or Seychelles for anti-piracy missions and to protect vital trade routes which may endanger China's energy security in the case of a conflict. In 2016, China established her first overseas naval base in Djibouti, which provided necessary support for Chinese fleet and troops.

China has reportedly begun testing designs for arsenal ships.

The Pentagon's name for the Chinese sea based militia is the People's Armed Forces Maritime Militia. Their future role is unknown, but war planners have been aware of their history and potential use in naval conflict.

See also 
 Chinese aircraft carrier programme
 China Coast Guard
 Dalian Naval Academy
 List of ships of the People's Liberation Army Navy
 People's Liberation Army Navy Band
 Political Commissar of the People's Liberation Army Navy
 Political Department of the People's Liberation Army Navy

References

Citations

Sources

External links 
 Chinese naval aircraft in service
 PLAN – Chinese Defence Today

 
2
1950 establishments in China